Badcall is a remote crofting township, located on the northern shore of the sea loch, Loch Inchard, in Sutherland, Scottish Highlands and is in the Scottish council area of Highland.

The township is located 1.5 miles east of Kinlochbervie.

References

Populated places in Sutherland